Xedio is a professional HD/SD modular application suite for News and Sports Production developed by EVS Broadcast Equipment.

Intended for broadcast professionals, it handles the acquisition, production, media management and the playout of News and sport media. Xedio suite integrates a non-linear editing system. This editor has been included in the IPDirector suite as a plug-in.

This solution is used by Channel One (Russia), RTL-TVI (Belgium), GOL TV (Spain), RTCG (Montenegro), BHRT (Bosnia and Herzegovina), Sky News (UK), ....

History

See also 

 EVS Broadcast Equipment

References

External links 
 Xedio at EVS Broadcast Equipment

Broadcast engineering
Video editing software for Windows